Since 1966, thirteen Israelis have been awarded the Nobel Prize, the most honorable award in various fields including chemistry, economics, literature and peace.   Israel has more Nobel Prizes per capita than the United States, France and Germany. It has more laureates, in real numbers, than India, Spain and China. If only scientific laureates are taken into account, Israel is 13th in Nobel prize per capita, just after Germany, 11th, and the United States, 12th. (2019).

Laureates
The following is a complete list of Israeli Nobel laureates.

See also

List of countries by Nobel laureates per capita
List of Israel Prize recipients
List of Jewish Nobel laureates
List of Nobel laureates by country

References

External links

Israel’s twelve Nobel laureates. The Jerusalem Post

 
Nobel
Israel